"This Is the Time" is a song performed by Billy Joel released as the third single from his album The Bridge. The song reached No. 18 on the U.S. Billboard Hot 100 and topped the Billboard Adult Contemporary chart.

Reception
Billboard called it a "melancholy rock ballad from a doom-filled perspective."  Cash Box said that the "songwriting genius of Joel is in force again in this wistful, melodic ballad."

Chart positions

In pop culture
The song was featured on the NBA VHS NBA Superstars, in a segment showcasing Hall of Fame players from the 1950s to the 1970s. It was also played during Larry Bird's retirement ceremony at the Boston Garden in 1993, this time honoring past players of the Boston Celtics.
"This Is the Time" is the title of a 2014 season 2 episode of The Carrie Diaries in which Carrie (AnnaSophia Robb) attends her senior prom. Joel's song is referenced by character Donna LaDonna (Chloe Bridges) during her prom queen acceptance speech as the music begins to play in the background. It is mentioned twice more in conversations shortly thereafter. The Correatown cover version of the song also plays in the closing minutes of this penultimate episode.
In Italy this song was used as opening and closing theme for the soap opera "Guiding Light" (In Italy called "Sentieri") from 1986 to 2007.

References

1986 singles
1986 songs
Billy Joel songs
Columbia Records singles
Song recordings produced by Phil Ramone
Songs written by Billy Joel